Bang Masters is a compilation album by Van Morrison released by Columbia's Legacy Records imprint in 1991. The tracks were remixed from the original multi-tracks and were given a wider stereo spread with less compression.  The alternate version of "Brown Eyed Girl"  included on this album was according to Bill Flannagan   take six  out of the twenty-two takes before the final form released in 1967 on Blowin' Your Mind!.

Track listing 
All songs by Van Morrison except as noted.
 "Brown Eyed Girl" – 3:03 
 "Spanish Rose" (alternate version) – 3:52
 "Goodbye Baby (Baby Goodbye)" (Wes Farrell, Bert Russell) – 2:57
 "Ro Ro Rosey" – 3:03
 "Chick-A-Boom" (Bert Berns, Morrison) – 3:12
 "It's All Right" – 4:58
 "Send Your Mind" – 2:52
 "The Smile You Smile" – 2:54
 "The Back Room" – 5:30
 "Midnight Special" (traditional) – 2:45
 "T.B. Sheets" – 9:36
 "He Ain't Give You None" (alternate version) – 5:50
 "Who Drove the Red Sports Car?" – 5:39
 "Beside You" – 6:05
 "Joe Harper Saturday Morning" (alternate version) – 4:15
 "Madame George" – 5:17
 "Brown Eyed Girl" (alternate take) – 3:40 
 "I Love You (The Smile You Smile)" – 2:22

Notes

References 
 Heylin, Clinton (2003). Can You Feel the Silence? Van Morrison: A New Biography, Chicago Review Press, 

Van Morrison compilation albums
1991 compilation albums
Albums produced by Bert Berns